Donnie Duncan (August 28, 1940 – March 12, 2016) was an American football coach and college athletics administrator. He served as the head football coach at Iowa State University from 1979 to 1982, compiling a record of 18–24–2. His 1980 and 1981 Cyclones squads both made appearances in the national rankings. The 1981 Cyclones began the season at 5–1–1 and rose to No. 11 in the AP Poll. Led by future National Football League (NFL) players Dwayne Crutchfield, Dan Johnson, Karl Nelson and Chris Washington, the Cyclones tied No. 5 Oklahoma (7–7) and downed No. 8 Missouri (34–13).

Death
Duncan from cancer on March 12, 2016, in Dallas.

Head coaching record

References

1940 births
2016 deaths
Iowa State Cyclones football coaches
Oklahoma Sooners athletic directors
Oklahoma Sooners football coaches
Austin College alumni
Deaths from cancer in Texas